The 2004 Molson Indy Montreal was the tenth round of the 2004 Bridgestone Presents the Champ Car World Series Powered by Ford season, held on August 29, 2004 at Circuit Gilles Villeneuve in Montreal, Quebec. Sébastien Bourdais took the pole and his teammate Bruno Junqueira won the race.

Qualifying results

Race

Caution flags

Notes

 New Race Record Bruno Junqueira 1:39:12.432
 Average Speed 113.049 mph

Championship standings after the race

Drivers' Championship standings

 Note: Only the top five positions are included.

References

External links
 Full Weekend Times & Results
 Friday Qualifying Results
 Saturday Qualifying Results
 Race Box Score

Montreal
Grand Prix of Montreal
Molson